Lazníky is a municipality and village in Přerov District in the Olomouc Region of the Czech Republic. It has about 500 inhabitants.

Administrative parts
The village of Svrčov is an administrative part of Lazníky.

Notable people
Miroslav Komárek (1924–2013), historical linguist

References

Villages in Přerov District